Chaetostoma taczanowskii is a species of catfish in the family Loricariidae. It is native to South America, where it occurs in the basins of the Huallaga River and the Urubamba River in Peru. The species reaches 17 cm (6.7 inches) in total length.

References 

taczanowskii
Fish described in 1882
Catfish of South America
Fish of Peru